Sean Harrington or Seán Harrington may refer to:

Seán Harrington (Irish republican) (1900–1976), IRA member from Dublin
Seán Harrington (Chief of Staff) (c.1915–1978), Chief of Staff of the IRA
Sean J. Harrington (born 1944), Canadian judge
Sean Harrington (basketball), 2002–03 Illinois Fighting Illini basketball player